Dawning of a New Era is an album credited to "The Coventry Automatics AKA The Specials", first released in 1993. The album is a collection of demo recordings from 1978, when the band was still known as "The Automatics". They would shortly rename themselves "The Coventry Automatics" before eventually becoming "The Specials". The release is notable for featuring an early lineup of the band, featuring original drummer Silverton Hutchinson and before the addition of toaster Neville Staple. It was also the first release of recordings of three songs not otherwise recorded by the band, "Wake Up", "Look But Don't Touch" and "Jay Walker". "Rock & Roll Nightmare" was retitled "Pearl's Cafe" and appeared on the "More Specials" album (featuring Rhoda Dakar on additional vocals).

Track listing

Personnel

Keyboards – Jerry Dammers
Rhythm Guitar, Backing Vocals – Lynval Golding
Lead Guitar – Roddy 'Radiation' Byers*
Bass – 'Sir' Horace 'Gentleman' Panter*
Drums – Silverton Hutchinson
Vocals – Terry Hall
Liner Notes – Laurence Cane-Honeysett

References

1994 compilation albums
The Specials compilation albums
Peel Sessions recordings